Carl Albrecht (15 September 1875 – 24 December 1952) was a major cotton merchant in the city-state of Bremen.

Biography
He was the son of the wealthy cotton merchant George Alexander Albrecht (1834–1898) and Louise Dorothea Betty Knoop (1844–1889). His father was the owner of the company Johann Lange Sohn's Wwe. & Co.; his mother was the daughter of the major industrialist, Baron Ludwig Knoop, one of the most successful entrepreneurs of the 19th century Russian Empire.

Following his military service from 1894 to 1895, he undertook an apprenticeship with the firm Gebrüder Plate (Plate Brothers). From 1896 to 1901 he lived in London, Moscow and the United States. In 1901 he joined the firm Sanders, Swann & Co., and in 1902 he founded his own company Friedrich Carl Albrecht with his partner Heinrich Müller-Pearse. The two also founded the Boston-based company Albrecht, Weld & Co. in cooperation with the American firm Stephen M. Weld & Co. In 1902 he founded Albrecht, Müller-Pearse & Co.

In 1902, he married the American Mary Ladson Robertson (1883–1960), who belonged to a prominent planter class and slave owner family from Charleston, Charleston County, South Carolina. They were the parents of the psychologist Carl Albrecht and the grandparents of the conductor George Alexander Albrecht and of the politician Ernst Albrecht. Among their great-grandchildren are the politician Ursula von der Leyen (née Albrecht), the businessman Hans-Holger Albrecht and the conductor Marc Albrecht.

His wife was the older sister of the cotton merchant Edward T. Robertson, who moved to Bremen in 1905 to establish Edward T. Robertson & Son.

References

Businesspeople from Bremen (state)
1875 births
1952 deaths
German expatriates in the United States
German expatriates in the Russian Empire
German expatriates in the United Kingdom
Albrecht family